The Mutations is a low-budget 1974 British-American science fiction/horror film directed by Jack Cardiff. The film was also released under the title The Freakmaker.

Plot

The film depicts a deranged genetic scientist, Professor Nolter (Donald Pleasence), a man with the self-proclaimed goal to break through to the next stage in human evolution, crossbreeding anthropophagous Venus flytraps with abducted college student guinea pigs from his own class. He plans to "create a race of plants that can walk, and men that can take root" through an exploitation of certain nucleic acids.

The failed experimental mutants are then given to a cruel circus freak show owner, Mr. Lynch (Tom Baker) who exploits them to the fullest. However, the mutants and the circus freaks will not be denied justice.

Production
Inspired by Tod Browning's film Freaks with a science fiction twist, this film is full of pseudo-scientific jargon, stop motion visuals, makeup effects, references to psychedelics, comical gore, nudity, and appearances by actors with actual genetic abnormalities as well as some fictional disabilities including a man with "rubber bones" known as the Human Pretzel, a lady with reptilian skin (Alligator Lady), a Monkey Woman, a Human Pincushion and Popeye.

Among the other scenes of "freaks" it depicts a reversed stop motion capture of the professor reviving a mouldy orange, and the professor feeding a rabbit to a Venus flytrap. A dissonant and jumbled orchestral score composed by Basil Kirchin provides the backdrop.

Cast
 Donald Pleasence as Professor Nolter 
 Tom Baker as Lynch 
 Brad Harris as Brian Redford 
 Julie Ege as Hedi 
 Michael Dunn as Burns 
 Scott Antony as Tony 
 Jill Haworth as Lauren 
 Olga Anthony as Bridget 
 Lisa Collings as Prostitute
 Joan Scott as Landlady 
 Toby Lennon as Tramp 
 John Wreford as Policeman
 Eithne Dunne as Nurse
 Richard Davies as Doctor

Release

Home media
The film was released on DVD by Subversive Cinema on September 27, 2005. Subversive Cinema later re-released the film on January 29, 2008 including with it commentary tracks with Jack Cardiff, Robert Weinbach, and Brad Harris as a part of its 2-Disk Greenhouse Gore movie pack. It was last released by Desert Island Films on February 18, 2012.

Reception

Author and film critic Leonard Maltin awarded the film  2 out of 4 stars, criticizing the film's predictable story and what he called "grotesque elements and characters". TV Guide awarded the film 1/5 stars, writing, "Though at times the film is so bad it's unintentionally funny, it has a certain cruelty to it." 
Michael H. Price of the Fort Worth Star-Telegram, gave the movie 3 stars and praised the movie, comparing it to Tod Browning's Freaks, and calling the effects "at once shocking and fascinating" and praising its "dissonant orchestral score" which he claims "adds mightily to the mood of unease and gathering madness."

References

External links
 
 
 

1974 films
1970s monster movies
British monster movies
1974 horror films
Columbia Pictures films
1970s English-language films
Films directed by Jack Cardiff
Films scored by Basil Kirchin
Films set in London
Films shot in London
1970s science fiction horror films
British science fiction horror films
Mad scientist films
Films about educators
1970s British films